The ACW Great American Championship was a secondary professional wrestling championship title in the American independent promotion Assault Championship Wrestling. The first champion was "The Machine" Jeff Rocker who won the title from Mercenary in Meriden, Connecticut on November 30, 2001. The championship was regularly defended throughout the state of Connecticut, most often in Meriden, Connecticut, until the promotion closed in early 2004.

Jeff Rocker, "Lightning" Johnny Thunder and Slyk Wagner Brown hold the record for most reigns, each having won the title twice. At 287 days, Tony DeVito's reign is the longest in the title's history. Johnny Thunder second reign, which lasted 28 days, was the shortest in the history of the title. Overall, there have been 9 reigns shared between 6 wrestlers, with two vacancies.

Title history

Reigns

Combined reigns

References

External links
Official ACW Great American Championship Title History
ACW Great American Championship at Genickbruch.com

Sports in Connecticut
Heavyweight wrestling championships
Regional professional wrestling championships